The Log Cabin Inn Ensemble, located in McKenzie Bridge, Oregon, is listed on the National Register of Historic Places.

Destroyed by fire, March 29, 2006.

See also
 National Register of Historic Places listings in Lane County, Oregon

References

National Register of Historic Places in Lane County, Oregon
Buildings and structures completed in 1907